Space Adventure or Space Adventures, or variation, may refer to:

 space opera, a genre of scifi
 The Space Adventure (video game) (コブラII: 伝説の男, Kobura II: Densetsu no Otoko, Cobra II: The Legendary Bandit), a video game based on the Japanese manga comic book series Space Adventures Cobra
 Space Adventures (comics), a U.S. anthology comic book series
 GURPS Space Adventures, the Space Adventures module for the GURPS RPG system
 Space Adventures – Music from 'Doctor Who' 1963–1968 (album), a 1987 album of BBC background music
 Space Adventures, a space tourism company
 "Space Adventure" (The Brak Show), a 2007 webisode
 "Space Adventure", a 2011 episode from season 3 of Mickey Mouse Clubhouse

See also

 The Great Space Adventure (film), a 1963 film
 
 
 
 
 Adventure (disambiguation)